Conospermum flexuosum, commonly known as the tangled smokebush, is a shrub endemic to Western Australia.

It blooms between May and October producing blue-white flowers.

It is found in sand pockets among granite outcrops, on winter-wet flat areas and along roadsides in the South West and Great Southern regions of Western Australia where it grows in sandy clay soils.

There are two subspecies:
 Conospermum flexuosum subsp. flexuosum
 Conospermum flexuosum subsp. laevigatum

References

External links

flexuosum
Endemic flora of Western Australia
Eudicots of Western Australia
Plants described in 1830
Taxa named by Robert Brown (botanist, born 1773)